François les bas-bleus is an opéra comique in three acts of 1883, with a French libretto by Ernest Dubreuil, Eugène Humbert, Paul Burani, and music by Firmin Bernicat, completed by André Messager.

Background
Bernicat had worked for some time in café-concert; he began work setting a libretto based on an old vaudeville Les beignets à la cour, which became an opéra-comique in three acts Les beignets du roi and was mounted at the Théâtre des Fantaisies-Parisiennes in Brussels in February 1882, with some success.

François les bas-bleus was first performed at the Théâtre des Folies-Dramatiques on 8 November 1883, and continued to play there until the following March. From 17 December 1887 it was revived at the Théâtre des Menus-Plaisirs for 50 performances, with Jane Pierny as Fanchon, Jacquin as François, Bartel as Pontcornet and Alice Berthier as the comtesse de la Savonnière. In October 1896 the Folies-Dramatiques revived it with Jean Périer in the title role.
The work was staged at the Théâtre des Bouffes-Parisiens on 17 January 1900 for a further 36 performances, with Périer again and Anne Tariol-Baugé as Fanchon.

Roles

Synopsis
The opera takes place in Paris in 1789. 
François les Bas-Bleus, friend of all sweethearts, is a letter-writer at the Carrefour Saint-Eustache, and in love with Fanchon, a street-singer. The marriage of the two would be quite straightforward, were it not that Fanchon decides to sing to François, a childhood birthday song, which instantly identifies her to the passing comtesse de la Savonnière. Without a doubt, this Fanchon is the child of the marquis de Pontcornet, raised in a circus. Fanchon’s aunt, is also in love with François les Bas-Bleus, and will do everything to prevent the wedding of her niece with the man whom she loves. But Fanchon has spirit – she refuses to wed her cousin, de Lansac, and remains loyal to François, imprisoned in the Bastille with the Marquis de Pontcornet, for whom he has so clearly written a song that he made it too progressive. 
It is now the 14th of July; the Bastille is taken, the Marquis and François are soon rescued. One decides to become a cider merchant, the other a commander of the garde nationale. In this guise François gains the power over the marquis, arrested as a suspect, naturally, on condition that he allows him to marry his daughter: François and Fanchon wed and all ends happily. 

The music contains a delightful writing-lesson duo, the song of François les Bas-Bleus, a waltz "Voici les roses", a Norman folksong "The little sailor" in the first Act. In the second, a love duet "Espérance en heureux jours" was enthusiastically received, while in the third Act the romance "A toi j'avais donné ma vie" was applauded.

References

Operas by André Messager
French-language operas
Operas
Opéras comiques
1883 operas
Operas set in Paris